Hawash! is a 1984 album by Finnish gospel musician Jaakko Löytty. It is his first album with clear African influences.

The title song was inspired by the Oromo musician Ali Mohammed Birra, whom Löytty met in 1976 during the Etiopiasafari tour. He met Birra in an Addis Abeba nightclub and bought his LP, which included a song about the River Hawash. Löytty wrote down a translation of the lyrics of the song on the inner sleeve of the album. This song later inspired him to write a song of the same name, the title song of this album.

Track listing
All words and music by Jaakko Löytty, arrangements by Jaakko Löytty and Ippe Kätkä.

Side one

Side two

Hawashband
Jaakko Löytty — vocals, acoustic guitar
Mikko Löytty — bass
Sakari Löytty — drums, percussion
Ippe Kätkä — drums, percussion
Heikki Silvennoinen — guitars
Jouko Laivuori — keyboards

Guests
Taru Hallama — vocals
Pave Maijanen — vocals
Lucjan Czaplicki — saxophone
Andrej Nowak — trumpet
Jimmy Amupala — spoken word

Production
Ippe Kätkä — producer, recording engineer, mixing
Heikki Silvennoinen — recording engineer, mixing
Jaakko Löytty, Tuomo Manninen, cover
John Muafangejo, cover woodcut

External links
Hawash! in Discogs

Jaakko Löytty albums
1984 albums